Aleksei Alekseyevich Foroponov (born 4 March 1987) is a former Russian professional football player.

Club career
He played 2 seasons in the Russian Football National League for FC Avangard Kursk.

External links
 
 

1987 births
Sportspeople from Kursk
Living people
Russian footballers
Association football defenders
FC Avangard Kursk players